WIMA (1150 kHz) is a commercial AM radio station in Lima, Ohio, owned and operated by  which also operates FM sister stations WIMT, WLWD, WZRX-FM and WMLX from its studio and office location on West Market Street. Its transmitter is located on McClain Road in Fort Shawnee. It is Lima's first and oldest commercial radio station. The call letters, when spoken like a word rhymes with the city of Lima, which is pronounced with a long "i" sound, unlike the capital city of Peru.

Early history
Originally WBLY (at 1240 on the AM dial) which aired traditional middle of the road programming in the early 1930s then switching the call letters to WLOK in the early 1940s. Veteran broadcaster Hugh Downs started at WLOK while a student at Bluffton University in nearby Bluffton, Ohio. Starting in radio under the leadership of the Hoosier Schoolmaster of the Air, Dr. Clarence M. Morgan, long time Lima broadcast legend Easter Straker was program director for many years in addition to hosting "Easter's Parade" a live mid-day program on WIMA and on Channel 35.'"Easter's Parade" was a midday show similar to the popular Ruth Lyons show out of Cincinnati. Talk and topics were aimed at the women, mothers and children that were the early watchers of the 1950s. Straker would discuss national, state and local issues with the Lima woman in mind. She instituted the "Teddy Bear Fund" with the local hospitals. This was to provide funds for Teddy Bears to every child admitted to Lima hospitals. One way to raise funds was to invite children to come down to the studio to be interviewed by Easter while sitting in her "birthday chair." While they were being questioned she would ask if they brought any tax stamps for the Teddy Bear. The tax stamps were then used to buy Teddy bears for sick children. In return children were offered the chance to help themselves to pennies in a giant glass jar. The handful of pennies to a young person was a thrill. The TV show continued until 1984, and the radio show until 1991, ending a few months before Straker's death in April 1992 from colon cancer at age 73.

It switched to the WIMA call sign in 1955. Its then-owner Lloyd A. Pixley, a former Ohio State football legend later founded WLOK-TV (later WIMA-TV now WLIO) and WIMA-FM (now WIMT) which was later sold to George Hamilton and Robert Mack's company Northwestern Ohio Broadcasting in 1964.

For much of its early years WIMA was a daytime station which eventually was granted an FM station in the late 1950s. WIMA-AM was granted a 24-hour license in 1970. WIMA-FM switched to a pre-recorded country music format in 1974, while WIMA-AM continued its "middle-of-the-road" format, with disc jockeys Alan DeBoer "Ace Alan", Tom Francis, Joe Jansen "J.J.", G. Arthur Versnick "Versnick on the Radio", and Andy Wetherall, under program director and deejay Jack Stower "J.S.", and station manager Les Rau.  Around that time WIMA-AM's MOR format evolved from traditional "old-line" MOR to a more contemporary flavor, the forerunner of today's adult contemporary music format.

In April 1974, Jack Stower moved from WIMA-AM, to WIMA-FM (Country Lovin'), to become that station's first manager.  Mr. Stower was succeeded by Joe Jansen as WIMA-AM program director.  WIMA-FM is now known as WIMT "T-102". The former WIMA-TV (now WLIO) was sold off in 1972 to Lima Communications Corporation, a division of Toledo-based Block Communications, owners of the Toledo Blade newspaper.

The WBLY call sign later moved to an AM station in Springfield, Ohio where it resided from 1954 to 2002 which is now WULM.

WIMA along with four other Clear Channel Lima radio stations were initially sold to Florida-based GoodRadio.TV LLC in May 2007, but the deal soon collapsed prior to FCC approval. The most recent proposed deal was to banker American Securities under the new name Frequency Licensing Partners LLC, but it has yet to be completed or approved. As of 2009, these stations (except WBUK) remain in Clear Channel's hands.

WIMA today

WIMA - outside of a local morning show - airs a lineup of syndicated programs (mostly from Premiere Networks) similar to many other iHeart talk stations, including shows hosted by Glenn Beck, Clay Travis & Buck Sexton, Sean Hannity, Jesse Kelly, and Coast to Coast AM with George Noory.

Station ownership
1935 - 1954 THE LIMA NEWS -- owned no other radio properties
1954 - 1964 OHIO STATE BROADCASTING -- also owned WIMA-FM in Lima
1964 - 1980 NORTHWEST OHIO BROADCASTING -- co-owned WIMT-FM / WLOK-TV Lima, WNDH-AM / WNDH-FM Napoleon
1980 - 1986 OHIO BROADCASTING LLC -- co-owned WSOM-AM / WSOM-FM Youngstown, WSTK-AM / WSTK-FM Canton
1986 - 1998 LIMA TELECASTING -- bought or purchased WMLX-FM and WBUK-FM Lima
1998 - 1999 JACOR COMMUNICATIONS -- owned multiple markets across the country
1999 -  CLEAR CHANNEL COMMUNICATIONS now  -- owns 800+ radio stations across the country

See also
List of radio stations in Ohio

References

External links
1150 WIMA

Lima, Ohio
IMA (AM)
Radio stations established in 1935
1935 establishments in Ohio
IHeartMedia radio stations